"Smiling Wine" is a song written by Sylvia Tyson, and most notable in a version recorded as a single by Canadian artist Shirley Eikhard. Eikhard's version of the song debuted at number 42 on the RPM Country Tracks chart on February 26, 1972. It peaked at number 1 on April 22, 1972.

Chart performance

References

1972 singles
Capitol Records singles
Shirley Eikhard songs